Lisa Zimouche is a French freestyle footballer.

Career

As a youth player, Zimouche join the youth academy of French side PSG. On July 27, 2013, she posted her first freestyle football video on Instagram.

She was the 2015 Female Panna World Champion. Zimouche is featured in football video game FIFA 21.

Personal life

She is of Algerian descent.

References

Freestyle footballers
French people of Algerian descent
French sportspeople
Living people
Street football players
Year of birth missing (living people)